David Schultz or Dave Schultz may refer to:
Dave Schultz (ice hockey) (born 1949), Canadian ice hockey player and coach
Dave Schultz (amateur wrestler) (1959–1996), American Olympic wrestler
David Schultz (professional wrestler) (born 1955), American professional wrestler

See also
Dave Schulz (disambiguation)